Xobdo.org is the first online Assamese dictionary to become available online on 10 March 2006. As of 6 August 2011 the database of this dictionary contains 37013 words of Assamese language. This is a wiki, where anybody can contribute and edit words in the dictionary provided they have a substantial knowledge of the Assamese language. Moreover, the dictionary has the facility to categorize the words as per their origin, nature and locality. It also has the facility of incorporating encyclopedic entries. This website uses UNICODE fonts which ensures global visibility of Assamese fonts when users set their character encoding option to Unicode (UTF-8).

The dictionary is the brainchild of Bikram M Baruah, an Assamese petroleum engineer based in Abu Dhabi. Later many interested people specialized in different areas joined as the working force behind this dictionary.

In 2007 xobdo.org added multiple interfaces to include 17 more languages spoken in the North East India:  Khasi, Dimasa, Bodo, Karbi, Nagamese, Garo, Ao, Mizo, Mishing, Tanii (Apatani), Monpa, Meitei-lon, Bishnupriya, Chakma, Kok-Borok,  Kuki, and Tanchangya aimed at giving a multilingual edge to the dictionary. Currently XOBDO gives a platform for 27 languages of North-East India, along with English. However, the database for these languages is still substantially small.

Authorship and management

A group of volunteers are responsible for adding words at XOBDO database. As of now the website has two levels of volunteers: "contributors" and "editors". A contributor enters an English and its corresponding Assamese word to the temporary database. Afterwards an editor assigns a unique "idea ID" to the corresponding English and Assamese words and carries on other editing works, if required, to match the standards of XOBDO. After assigning the idea ID the words are added to the main database ready to be retrieved by a user.

Technical details
Initially xobdo.org employed Microsoft server tools and technologies. It ran ASPs on Windows IIS and the primary database on RDBMS  based on Microsoft SQL Server. However, in 2007it moved to open source technology and started running PHPs on Apache and an RDBMS on MySQL.

References

External links
 XOBDO: An Online Assamese Dictionary
 Learn Assamese
 Xophur Xobolikoron Achoni
 XOBDO.ORG Workshops: A series of workshops on Assamese Typing in Unicode

XOBDO
XOBDO
Assamese language
Internet properties established in 2006